Robert "Sonny" Wood (December 31, 1922 – July 11, 1970) was an American professional basketball and minor league baseball player. He played in the National Basketball League for the Dayton Rens during the 1948–49 season and averaged 6.7 points per game. He also competed in independent leagues and the American Basketball League. Wood served in the Army in World War II.

References

1922 births
1970 deaths
United States Army personnel of World War II
American Basketball League (1925–1955) players
American men's basketball players
Basketball players from New York (state)
Dayton Rens players
Guards (basketball)
Military personnel from New York (state)
New York Renaissance players
Baseball players from New York City
20th-century African-American sportspeople